Duodenal cytochrome B (Dcytb) also known as cytochrome b reductase 1 is an enzyme that in humans is encoded by the  gene.

Dcytb CYBRD1 was first identified as a ferric reductase enzyme which catalyzes the reduction of Fe3+ to Fe2+ required for dietary iron absorption in the duodenum of mammals.  Dcytb mRNA and protein levels in the gut are increased by iron deficiency and hypoxia which acts to promote dietary iron absorption.  The effect of iron deficiency and hypoxia on Dcytb levels are medicated via the HIF2 (Hypoxia inducible factor 2) transcription factor which binds to hypoxia response elements within the Dcytb promoter and increases transcription of the gene. DCYTB protein has also been found in other tissues, such as lung epithelial cells and in the plasma membrane of mature red blood cells of scorbutic species (unable to make ascorbate) such as human and guinea pig but not in other species which have retained the ability to synthesise ascorbate like mice and rat.  This has led to the notion that Dcytb may have an additional role in ascorbate metabolism in scorbutic species.  DCYTB protein has also been found in breast tissue (epithelial and myoepithelial cells) and high DCYTB levels are associated with a favourable prognosis in patients with breast cancer.  A single nucleotide polymorphism (SNP) within the DCYTB promoter (SNP rs884409)  which reduced functional DCYTB promoter activity was also associated with reduced serum ferritin levels in a patient cohort with C282Y haemochromatosis.

References

External links 
 

Physiology
Enzymes